"Sometimes It's a Bitch" is a song by American singer Stevie Nicks, written by Billy Falcon and Jon Bon Jovi, who also produced the track alongside Danny Kortchmar. It was the first single released from Nicks' compilation album Timespace: The Best of Stevie Nicks (1991). The single peaked at number 56 on the US Billboard Hot 100 and reached the top 20 in Australia and Canada. A music video for the song was filmed, featuring clips of Nicks from 1981 to 1991. Nicks admitted she was unhappy about singing the word "bitch" but decided the message of the song was what mattered.

Track listings
7-inch and cassette single
 "Sometimes It's a Bitch" – 4:37
 "Desert Angel" – 5:21

12-inch and CD single
 "Sometimes It's a Bitch" – 4:36
 "Desert Angel" – 5:20
 "Battle of the Dragons" – 5:11

Charts

References

 ''Crystal Visions – The Very Best of Stevie Nicks, liner notes and commentary
 http://rockalittle.com/offtherecord.htm

Stevie Nicks songs
1991 singles
1991 songs
Atlantic Records singles
EMI Records singles
Modern Records (1980) singles
Songs written by Billy Falcon
Songs written by Jon Bon Jovi